The Oxford Institute for Energy Studies is an energy research institution which was founded in 1982, and serves a worldwide audience with its research, guides understanding of all major energy issues. It is a recognised independent centre of the University of Oxford.

References

External links
Oxford Institute for Energy Studies Website
Oxford Institute for Energy Studies Library
OIES research papers in the Oxford Research Archive
OIES research papers in the library catalogue (SOLO)

Organisations associated with the University of Oxford